is a Japanese manga artist known for his works Rokudenashi Blues and Rookies. He made his debut while still in high school and was an assistant of Tetsuo Hara on Fist of the North Star.

Works

Serialized manga
  (1988–1997); serialized in Shueisha's Weekly Shōnen Jump and collected in 42 tankōbon volumes
 Rookies (1998–2003); serialized in Shueisha's Weekly Shōnen Jump and collected in 24 tankōbon volumes
  (2009); one-shot published in Shueisha's Weekly Young Jump
  (2005–2015; 2019); serialized in Shueisha's Weekly Shōnen Jump (2005–2006) and Weekly Young Jump (2007–2015; 2019) and collected in 20 tankōbon volumes
  (2022–present); serialized in Shueisha's Grand Jump

Other
 Bachi – Atari Rock (1987); one-shot published in Shueisha's Weekly Shōnen Jump and collected in one volume with other one-shot stories in 1988 (reissued in 2010)
  (2004); collection of one-shot stories published from 1991 to 2004 (reissued in 2010)
  (2005; collection of one-shot stories)
 Hello Baby (2007); one-shot illustrated by Takeshi Obata and published in Shueisha's Jump Square
  (2014); one-shot illustrated  and published in Shueisha's Weekly Young Jump
  (2017); illustrated book published by

References

External links 
 

1966 births
Living people
Manga artists from Shiga Prefecture
People from Shiga Prefecture